Team Graner–Stradalli is a pro cycling team formed by Stradalli Cycle with sponsorship from Graner Law and Jaco Clothing. The team is made up of four seasoned pro riders along with four developmental juniors.

History

Team beginnings: 2013
The team is a collaboration between Stradalli Cycles and World Master's champion, Grant Potter, who was approach to establish a new pro cycling team. The team's main goals are to race healthy and happy while educating cyclists on how to race but have fun and respect others in the cycling community. The team is sponsored by Graner Law and Jaco Clothing.

Team roster

References

External links 

Stradalli Official Homepage
Stradalli Racing Facebook

Cycling teams based in the United States
Cycling teams established in 2013